Koya-dofu (kōya-dōfu, 高野豆腐 in Japanese) also known as Shimi-dofu, Kori-dofu, or Koyasan-dofu is frozen-dried tofu, a Japanese pantry staple and an important ingredient in Buddhist vegetarian cookery. It originated from Japan. It is made of soy, coagulants, and baking soda. It looks like a hard sponge and needs to be soaked before use. It is mainly used in stews and soups.

History 
Freeze-dried tofu originated in Japan in the mid-1500s. The earliest mention of freeze-dried tofu in the West was by Paillieux in 1880.

Japan 
In Japan, frozen-dried tofu was developed before frozen tofu. There are two traditional centers of origination of freeze-dried tofu in Japan, including Mount Koya and Nagano.

Mount Koya 
It was developed by Mokujiki Shonin, a Shingon priest in the early 1600s during the Edo Period. He encouraged all the mountain temples to make their own tofu after he obtained large amounts of soybeans from the head Shingon temple. The purpose of this was to preserve some of the frozen tofu until the Spring equinox. Firm tofu was left outdoors in the cold windy night to freeze. After it was frozen, it was allowed to stand on shelves in a shed for fifteen days at temperatures below freezing, thawed in warm water and pressed lightly to expel the melted ice, then dried in the shed using heat from charcoal braziers.

Nagano 
Nagano, located to the northeast of Tokyo, was the second center of origination. Freeze-dried tofu was first made during the mid-1500s. It was made by the famous feudal lord and warrior, Takeda Shingen, who developed a new drying process. The purpose was to make nutritious, but lightweight food for the soldiers. Firm tofu was frozen solid on boards outdoors in the snow. It was then wrapped in straw mats and placed in a cold barn for seven days, after which five pieces of tofu were tied together with bits of rice straw, which were then hung from poles, away from the sunlight. After thawing the frozen portions in the day then freezing at night multiple times, the tofu became a hard sponge.

West 
In the West, one of the first known mentions of freeze-dried tofu was by Paillieux in 1880, "Sometimes during the winter tofu is frozen, then dried to give it a sponge-like texture. In this state, it lasts a long time and can be cooked in various ways."

Trimble mentioned the koya-dofu in the United States in 1896. It was mentioned as kori-tofu in 1899. In 1904, a mention appeared in the article "The Use of Frost in Making Japanese Foods," by Loew.

In 1906, Senft, a member of the German Military Food Administration, mentioned koya-dofu as a preserved food used by the Japanese military during the Russo-Japanese War.

Commercial production

Japan 
As of 1980, 90% of the production of dried-frozen tofu in Japan was handled by a handful of companies in the Nagano area. Asahimatsu was the largest company as it accounted for over 55% of the country's dried-frozen tofu production. Misuzu-dofu, Nagai Sogo Shokuhin, Yamaguchi-ya, Taishi Shokuhin Kogyo, and Habutae-dofu were the other freeze-dried tofu producing companies.

Production 
The method of freeze-drying is used for production. The liquid of the bean curd turns into ice. Freezing changes the color, texture, size, and weight, after which it is thawed. At the end of the process, a beige and sponge-like tofu essence are achieved.

Consumption 
Koya dofu needs to be soaked in hot water for five minutes and then firmly pressed it before use. It can be ground into tofu meal and flour, or made into tofu croutons.

Nutrition and health 
Koya-dofu is high in nutritional value. The way it is produced lets soy protein mature naturally, which helps in the development of new textures, preserving maximum nutritious value. Phytonutrients become more concentrated in it. Freeze-dried tofu serves as a source of protein, iron, and calcium. The protein in koya-dofu makes up the fundamental structures of somatic cells. Consumption of this type of tofu lowers the risk of heart disease, diabetes, and obesity.

References 

Ancient dishes
Buddhist cuisine
Japanese cuisine terms
Meat substitutes
Soy-based foods
Tofu
Vegetarian cuisine
Vegetarian dishes of Japan